The Little Escapade is a 1931 German comedy film directed by Reinhold Schünzel and starring Renate Müller, Hermann Thimig and Hans Brausewetter. It was shot at the Babelsberg Studios in Berlin and premiered at the city's Gloria-Palast. The film's sets were designed by the art directors Robert Herlth, Walter Röhrig and Werner Schlichting. A separate French-language version was also made.

Synopsis
A woman pretends that she is having an affair as a joke on her husband, but as he decides to start divorce proceedings she realises she has taken the joke too far.

Cast

References

Bibliography

External links 
 

1931 films
Films of the Weimar Republic
German comedy films
1931 comedy films
1930s German-language films
Films directed by Reinhold Schünzel
UFA GmbH films
German multilingual films
German black-and-white films
1931 multilingual films
1930s German films
Films shot at Babelsberg Studios